Wolfgang Zeller (12 September 1893 – 11 January 1967) was a German composer noted for his complex film music.

Life
Born in Biesenrode (now part of Mansfeld), Province of Saxony, Kingdom of Prussia, German Empire, Zeller was the son of a vicar.  As a child, he studied violin and showed an aptitude for composition. After graduating from high school in Potsdam, Zeller continued studies with violinist Felix Berger in Munich, and with composer Jean Paul Ertel, in Berlin. Zeller fought in the First World War. After being discharged from duty due to an injury, he made a living as a violinist with the Deutsches Opernhaus. Between 1921 and 1929 he was violinist and in-house composer for the Berlin Volksbühne orchestra.

Wolfgang Zeller died in Berlin in 1967.

Film music
His film music career was launched with the orchestral score he composed for The Adventures of Prince Achmed. The animated film created by Lotte Reiniger premiered in Berlin in 1926. The score for Walter Ruttmann's Melodie der Welt, the first full-length German sound film, followed in 1929. During the Third Reich, Zeller wrote music for propaganda films such as Jud Süß (1940) directed by Veit Harlan. After the war, Mr. Zeller continued to work as a film composer and wrote music for anti-fascist films like Marriage in the Shadows (1947). Zeller's last score was for the documentary Serengeti Shall Not Die (1959) by Bernhard Grzimek.

Selected filmography

References
"The concise Cinegraph: encyclopaedia of German cinema" By Hans-Michael Bock, Tim Bergfelder

External links
 
 French biography pdf

1893 births
1967 deaths
People from Mansfeld
People from the Province of Saxony
German military personnel of World War I
German Protestants
German film score composers
Male film score composers
German male composers
20th-century German composers
20th-century German male musicians
Burials at the Waldfriedhof Zehlendorf